The Doyle Baronetcy, of Guernsey, was created 29 October 1825 in the Baronetage of the United Kingdom for John Doyle. It became extinct in 1834. Boyle had been gazetted a baronet in 1805 but this creation does not appear to have passed the Great Seal.

The Doyle Baronetcy, of Buscombe, was created 18 February 1828 in the Baronetage of the United Kingdom for Lieutenant Colonel Francis Doyle. It became extinct in 1987.

Doyle Baronets, of Guernsey (1825)
 Sir John Doyle, 1st Baronet (died 1834)

Doyle Baronets, of Buscombe (1828)
 Sir Francis Hastings Doyle, 1st Baronet (1783–1839)
 Sir Francis Hastings Charles Doyle, 2nd Baronet (1810–1888)
 Sir Everard Hastings Doyle, 3rd Baronet (1852–1933)
 Sir Arthur Havelock James Doyle, 4th Baronet (1858–1948)
 Sir John Francis Reginald William Hastings Doyle, 5th Baronet (1912–at least 1985)

References

Extinct baronetcies in the Baronetage of the United Kingdom
1825 establishments in the United Kingdom
1828 establishments in the United Kingdom